The Tomb of God is a 1996 speculative non-fiction book by Richard Andrews and Paul Schellenberger, which charted as a number one bestseller. It claimed that the body of Jesus Christ was reburied in the 12th century on Pech-le-Cardou (Mount Cardou) in the Rennes-le-Château region of France. They arrived at this idea through tracing map references within the parchments described in the book Holy Blood, Holy Grail. However, the authors do not succeed in locating the tomb or evidence relating to it on the mountain itself.

The book became the focus of a BBC 2 Timewatch documentary "The History of a Mystery" shown in September 1996, in which the authors faced difficult questions over their methods and assumptions. The theory is not taken seriously by academic scholars.

References

Bibliography 
 Richard Andrews, Paul Schellenberger, The Tomb of God: The Body of Jesus and The Solution To A 2000-year-old Mystery (London: Little, Brown, 1996 ).

1996 non-fiction books
Books about Jesus
Pseudoarchaeological texts
Alleged tombs of Jesus